Fair Trade Commission may refer to:

 Fair Trade Commission (Taiwan), a government agency of the Republic of China
 Fair Trade Commission (Japan)
 Fair Trade Commission (South Korea)
 Fair Trade USA
 Fair Trading Commission, a government agency of Barbados